Cherbourg-en-Cotentin is a city in the department of Manche, Normandy, northwestern France, established on 1 January 2016. The commune takes its name from Cherbourg, the main town of the commune, and the Cotentin Peninsula. Cherbourg is an important commercial, ferry and military port on the English Channel. Cherbourg-en-Cotentin is a Maritime prefecture and sub-prefecture of Manche. Due to its union, it is the most populous commune in its department with 79,144 inhabitants as of 2018 (of which 35,545 in Cherbourg-Octeville), making it the first city of the department before the Saint-Lô prefecture and the second in the region after Caen. Its urban unit is composed of three communes (Cherbourg-en-Cotentin, Martinvast and Tollevast), and has 81,963 inhabitants (2018). Its larger functional area (covering 77 communes) has 152,630 inhabitants (2018).

Toponymy

The onomastics of Cherbourg-en-Cotentin are, particularly for the first particle, heavily contested. Theories include descent from Latin, Gallo-Latin, Proto-Germanic, Anglo-Saxon, and Old Norse. A medieval folk etymology from *Caesaris burgis ("Caesar's town", from Julius Caesar) is easily discounted.

Administration
The municipality was established on 1 January 2016 by merger of the former communes of Cherbourg-Octeville, Équeurdreville-Hainneville, La Glacerie, Querqueville and Tourlaville. The seat of the commune is in Cherbourg. Cherbourg-Octeville was established on 28 February 2000 by merger of the former communes of Cherbourg and Octeville.

Cherbourg-en-Cotentin is part of the arrondissement of Cherbourg, and of 6 cantons: Cherbourg-en-Cotentin-1, Cherbourg-en-Cotentin-2, Cherbourg-en-Cotentin-3, Cherbourg-en-Cotentin-4, Cherbourg-en-Cotentin-5 and La Hague.

Population

Housing
In 2017, in Cherbourg-en-Cotentin there were 43,118 dwellings of which 88.8% of primary residences, 3.5% second homes and 7.7% vacant houses. 50.5% were houses and 48.8% were apartments. Of the 37,983 principal residences built before 2015, the largest share (35.7%) was built between 1971 and 1990. 6.6% were built between 2006 and 2014, which is much lower than the departmental rate (11.1%).

The commune shares the social housing with the Communauté d'agglomération du Cotentin. Several HLM agencies are responsible for social housing of the agglomeration: Presqu'île Habitat, Les Cités Cherbourgeoises, HLM du Cotentin, Manche Habitat and HLM Coutances Granville.

Education

Public senior high schools/sixth-form colleges include:
 Lycée Jean-François-Millet (former Cherbourg-Octeville)
 Lycée Victor-Grignard (former Cherbourg-Octeville)
 Lycée Alexis-de-Tocqueville (former Cherbourg-Octeville)

Private senior high schools/sixth-form colleges include:
 Lycée privé Thomas-Hélye (former Cherbourg-Octeville)

Politics

Presidential elections second round

Sights 
 
 
 The Church of Saint-Clément

See also 
Cherbourg Harbour
Communes of the Manche department

References

External links
 Cherbourg-en-Cotentin 

 
Communes of Manche
Subprefectures in France
Populated places established in 2016
2016 establishments in France
Populated coastal places in France